"Quién" is a song recorded by the Spanish singer-songwriter Pablo Alborán. The song was released as the third single from his second studio album Tanto (2012). It was released in April 2013 as a digital download in Spain. The single peaked at number 1 on the Spanish Singles Chart in May 2013.

Music video
The official music video for "Quién" was released on 3 May 2013.

Track listing

Chart performance
"Quién" debuted at number 46 on the Spanish singles chart for the week commencing 5 May 2013, before reaching number 1 the following week.

Weekly charts

Year-end charts

Release history

See also
 List of number-one singles of 2013 (Spain)

References

2013 singles
2012 songs
Pablo Alborán songs
Number-one singles in Spain
Songs written by Pablo Alborán
Warner Music Spain singles